Pedro Manuel Benítez Arpolda (12 January 1901 – 31 January 1974) was a Paraguayan football goalkeeper. In 1930, he played in the FIFA World Cup in Uruguay, for the Paraguayan team. In 1932, he played 9 matches in the Club Atlético Atlanta, in the Argentinian First League. This club, in those years, was contracted a complete team of Paraguayan footballers.

References

1901 births
1974 deaths
Sportspeople from Luque
Paraguayan footballers
Paraguayan expatriate footballers
Paraguay international footballers
1930 FIFA World Cup players
Association football goalkeepers
Expatriate footballers in Argentina
Paraguayan expatriate sportspeople in Argentina